Blyth railway station served Blyth, Northumberland on the Blyth Branch line in Northeast England.

History
The Blyth, Seghill and Percy Main Railway opened the line to Blyth on 3 March 1847 and the first station was at Croft Street (now King Street). On 1 May 1867 a new station was opened to replace the original station. It was at the north end of Turner Street (now part of Regent Street) on the site now occupied by Morrisons supermarket and the Community Hospital.

The Blyth, Seghill and Percy Main Railway became the Blyth and Tyne Railway in 1853 and was taken over by the North Eastern Railway (NER) in 1874. By the 1890s the increase in goods and passenger traffic was such that a new station was needed. The NER originally planned to build a new station on newly reclaimed land on Bridge Street, between Union Street and Beaconsfield Street, but these were turned down after an objection from the neighbouring Thomas Knight Memorial Hospital, on the grounds of noise.

The NER therefore rebuilt the existing station between 1894 and 1896, at a cost of £20,000. Most of the building was by J & W Simpson of Blyth. Despite being next to a through line, the station was a terminus. It faced Turner Street and had a single island platform projecting from the rear which was half covered by a glazed apex canopy. Adjacent were a goods shed next to Delaval Terrace and a coaling stage. To the west stood South Blyth loco shed, first built in 1879 with three roads and extended to six roads in 1895, and a cattle dock. To the north passed the freight-only lines to the NER coaling staiths, Blyth gas works, Blyth Harbour Commission and shipyard.

The station originally had two signal boxes: Blyth Signal Box at the end of the passenger platforms and Blyth Crossing Box controlling the level crossing near the engine shed on Renwick Road (previously Alexandra Crescent). Blyth Signal Box was destroyed by a German parachute mine on the night of 25 April 1941, killing the signaller instantly. Thereafter only Blyth Crossing Box was used.

Passenger services were withdrawn on 2 November 1964 under The Reshaping of British Railways; the station buildings stood derelict until they were demolished in 1972. Today nothing remains of the station itself or associated buildings, except for the Station Master's house in Delaval Terrace which survives as a private home.

Proposals for a new railway service
These early, informal, proposals suggested serving Blyth, not by reopening the branch to Blyth, but by reopening Newsham station where the Blyth branch joined the now freight-only Blyth and Tyne main line.

Denis Murphy, the then Labour MP for Wansbeck, expressed support in the House of Commons in an adjournment debate in April 1999 and again in a debate in January 2007.  The Railway Development Society (renamed Railfuture in 2000) also endorsed the proposal in 1998.

In the early 2010s, Northumberland County Council (NCC) became interested in the reintroduction of passenger services onto remaining freight-only sections of the former Blyth and Tyne Railway network. In June 2013 NCC commissioned Network Rail to complete a GRIP 1 study to examine the best options for the scheme. The GRIP 1 study was received by NCC in March 2014 and in June 2015 they initiated a more detailed GRIP 2 Feasibility Study at a cost of £850,000.

The study suggested that due to redevelopment of sections of the former branch line, Blyth should be served by a new park and ride station close to the site of Bebside station, though Newsham would also be reopened to serve the Newsham area of the town. At the time it was suggested that, subject to funding being raised for the £191 million scheme, detailed design work could begin in October 2018 with construction commencing four months later and the first passenger services introduced in 2021 though by October 2018 such works were yet to begin.

After receiving the GRIP 2 study, NCC initially announced that they were preceding with a GRIP 3 Study from Network Rail but such a report was not commissioned at the time. Despite a change in the political leadership of Northumberland County Council following the 2017 local elections the authority continued to work towards the reintroduction of a passenger service onto the line, encouraged by the Department for Transport's November 2017 report, A Strategic Vision for Rail, which named the line as a possible candidate for a future reintroduction of passenger services. Consequentially, NCC commissioned a further interim study in November 2017 (dubbed GRIP 2B) to determine whether high costs and long timescales identified in the GRIP 2 Study could be reduced by reducing the initial scope of the project but the report failed to deliver on this.

The county council has, however, continued to develop the project, announcing an additional £3.46 million in funding for a further business case and detailed design study (equivalent to GRIP 3) to be completed by the end of 2019. However, the revised proposals, released in July 2019, are reduced in scope from the plan considered in the 2016 GRIP 2 study and propose 4-phase project to reduce the initial cost of the scheme. Indeed, under the £90 million Phase 1, Newsham would be the only station reopened to serve Blyth on the Newcastle to Ashington Northumberland Line passenger service; possibly occurring as early as 2022. The park and ride station at Bebside proposed in the GRIP 2 study is instead proposed as an additional station to be added in Phase 2.

The North East Joint Transport Committee's bid for £377 million of funding from the UK Government's £1.28 billion Transfroming Cities Fund, submitted on 20 June 2019, includes £99 million to fund the reintroduction of passenger services between Newcastle, Newsham and Ashington, while further work is ongoing to secure additional public and private investment for the project.

References

Sources

Beeching closures in England
Disused railway stations in Northumberland
Railway stations in Great Britain opened in 1847
Railway stations in Great Britain opened in 1867
Railway stations in Great Britain closed in 1867
Railway stations in Great Britain closed in 1964
Former North Eastern Railway (UK) stations
Blyth, Northumberland
1847 establishments in England